The rib eye or ribeye (known as Scotch fillet in Australia and New Zealand) is a boneless rib steak from the rib section.

Description

Ribeye steaks are mostly composed of the longissimus dorsi muscle but also contain the complexus and spinalis muscles. The longissimus dorsi is also referred to as the "eye of the ribeye". The spinalis is also referred to as the "ribeye cap" and the complexus is a small muscle at the front of the ribeye which may be trimmed off by the butcher.

It is both flavoursome and tender, coming from the lightly worked upper rib cage area which spans from the sixth to twelfth ribs of the cattle. Its marbling of fat makes it very good for fast and hot cooking.

Terminology 
 In Australia and New Zealand, "ribeye" refers to a bone-in rib steak, while the boneless ribeye is known as "Scotch fillet" or "whiskey fillet".
 In French cuisine, the entrecôte corresponds to the rib eye steak, while rib steak is called côte de bœuf (literally: "beef rib").
 In Argentine cuisine, the rib eye is known as ojo de bife, while the rib steak is known as ancho de bife.
 In Chilean cuisine, the boneless rib steak is known as lomo vetado.
 In Spanish cuisine, the rib eye is known by its French name, entrecot.
 In French Canada, mainly the province of Québec, it is called "Faux filet" (literally: "fake fillet").
 In Austria the same cut is known as "Rostbraten", it is usually cut thinner at 0,5-1 cm.
On the West Coast of the United States, a boneless rib eye steak is sometimes called a "Spencer steak".

See also

 Beef ribs
 Cheesesteak
 Delmonico
 Entrecôte
 List of steak dishes
 Prime rib

Notes

Sources

External links
 USDA Institutional Meat Purchase Specifications
 "Picture and Diagram of beef cuts"
 National Cattlemen's Beef Association
 Better Cut Beef

Cuts of beef